Richard David "Richie" Griffiths (born 21 March 1942) is an English former footballer who played in the Football League as a fullback for Colchester United.

Career

Born in Earls Colne, Griffiths joined local club Colchester United as an apprentice, breaking into the first team squad in 1962. He made his debut on 3 February 1962 in a 1–1 away draw with Hartlepools United and went on to make 48 league appearances for the club. He made his final appearance on 5 October 1964 in a 1–0 home defeat to Grimsby Town before retiring from the game to join the Police force. He also played for local amateur side Colchester Casuals after leaving the U's.

References

1942 births
Living people
People from Earls Colne
English footballers
Association football fullbacks
Colchester United F.C. players
Colchester Casuals F.C. players
English Football League players